USS Justin was a steamship acquired by the United States Navy for use as a collier. Her task was to carry coal and to provide it to ships and stations. Her task was one that was being phased out, as the navies of the world were shifting from coal to oil to drive their ships.

Service history

The first Justin to be named as such by the U.S. Navy, she was completed in 1891 by R. Dixon & Co., Middlesbrough, England; purchased from Bowring & Archibald; and commissioned on 27 April 1898. Justin performed collier service in the Chesapeake Bay area until sailing for Guantánamo Bay on 2 June for coaling duties during the Spanish–American War. Returning to Virginia, Justin operated along the U.S. East Coast and in New England, then departed Norfolk, Virginia on 11 October. After visiting Brazil, Chile, Peru, and Mexico, she arrived San Francisco, California on 3 February 1899 and decommissioned there on 17 February.

Recommissioned at Mare Island, California on 19 September 1900, Justin sailed on 1 October for duty in the Far East. For the next seven years, she provided fuel and supplies to the Asiatic Fleet during a period of intense and growing American activity in the Orient. She returned to San Francisco, California on 23 November 1907 via Guam and Honolulu. From 1907 to 1915, Justin carried coal to units of the Pacific Fleet stationed at widely scattered points from the U.S. West Coast to South America. She decommissioned at Mare Island 20 December 1915, and was sold into commercial service in 1916 and scrapped in 1933.

References

External links
NavSource Online: Service Ship Photo Archive – Justin

Steamships of the United States Navy
Colliers of the United States Navy
Ships built on the River Tees
1890 ships
Spanish–American War auxiliary ships of the United States